Darrelle Valsaint (born 29 May 2000) is an American-born Haitian boxer. He competed in the men's middleweight event at the 2020 Summer Olympics.

Professional boxing record

References

External links
 

2000 births
Living people
Haitian male boxers
Olympic boxers of Haiti
Boxers at the 2020 Summer Olympics
Boxers from Florida